Stephen Eales is a professor of astrophysics at Cardiff University, where he is currently head of the Astronomy Group. In 2015, he was awarded the Herschel Medal from the Royal Astronomical Society for outstanding contributions to observational astrophysics. He also writes articles and books about astronomy.

Research 

His main research field is the new field of submillimetre astronomy, in particular using submillimetre observations to investigate the origin and evolution of galaxies. He has led a number of large submillimetre observing programmes. In particular, with Loretta Dunne he led the Herschel ATLAS the largest survey of the extragalactic sky carried out with the Herschel Space Observatory.

Bibliography 
Origins – how the planets, stars, galaxies and the universe began (Springer 2007 ).
Planets and Planetary Systems (textbook) (John Wiley and Sons 2009)

References 

Footnotes

Sources
Winners of RAS medals in 2015
Smoking Supernovae and Dusty Galaxies, Sky and Telescope 2004 
The Final Frontier, Astronomy Now, 1997, Vol. 11, No. 6, p. 41
Cool dust and baby stars, Physics World, Volume 26, 1
Pilbratt, G. et al. 2010, Herschel Space Observatory – an ESA facility for far-infrared and submillimetre astronomy, Astronomy and Astrophysics, 518, L1

British astrophysicists
Year of birth missing (living people)
Living people
Academics of Cardiff University